Field of View Best: Fifteen Colours is the second greatest hits album by Japanese pop-rock band Field of View. It was released on 11 October 2000 on Nippon Columbia, on the same day as their 16th single "Akikaze no Monochrome". The album includes various singles and songs from their previous studio albums. The album reached #23 in its first week and sold 11,000 copies. The album charted for 2 weeks and sold more than 15,000 copies.

Track listing

Cover version
Miho Komatsu covered "Kawaita Sakebi" on her 6th album, Hanano. Zard covered "Totsuzen" on their 7th studio album, Today Is Another Day.

Usage in media
"Totsuzen" was used in a commercial for Pocari Sweat.
"Doki" was used in a commercial for All Nippon Airways as part of their "ANA's Paradise" promotion.
"Kawaita Sakebi" was used as the opening theme for the 1998 anime adaptation of Yu-Gi-Oh!.
"Meguru Kisetsu wo Koete" was used as the ending theme for the Fuji TV program Unbelievable.
"Kimi wo Terasu Taiyou Ni" was used as the ending theme for Tokyo Broadcasting System Television program Uwasa no! Tokyo Magazine.
"Aoi Kasa de" was used as ending theme for the Tokyo Broadcasting System Television program Kinniku Banzuke.
"Beautiful day" was used as opening theme for the Yomiuri Telecasting Corporation program Shuffle.
"Fuyu no Ballad" was used as the ending theme for Tokyo Broadcasting System Television program Kokoro no Tobira.
"Still" was used as the ending theme for Tokyo Broadcasting System Television program Wonderful.

References

Being Inc. compilation albums
Nippon Columbia albums
2000 compilation albums
Japanese-language compilation albums
Field of View albums